The Georgia Bulldogs equestrian team represents the University of Georgia in NCAA Division I emerging sport of equestrian as part of the National Collegiate Equestrian Association.

NCAA National Team Championships
The team has won 7 National Championships.

Facilities
The team began competing in the 109-acre UGA Equestrian Complex, located in Bishop, Georgia in January 2009. This location was previously High Point Farm which originally opened in 1993. In 1996, the site served as training site for the U.S. Dressage Team. As of 2017, the UGA property in Bishop housed sixty horses.

References

External links
 

Equestrian sports in the United States
College sports teams in Georgia (U.S. state)
Sports clubs established in 2001
2001 establishments in Georgia (U.S. state)